Jayden Seales (born 10 September 2001) is a Trinidadian cricketer. Seales made his international debut for the West Indies cricket team in June 2021.

Career
He made his Twenty20 debut on 18 August 2020, for the Trinbago Knight Riders in the 2020 Caribbean Premier League, taking one wicket in the match. Prior to his T20 debut, he was named in the West Indies' squad for the 2020 Under-19 Cricket World Cup. He made his first-class debut on 11 December 2020, for the West Indies A against New Zealand A, during the West Indies tour of New Zealand. He made his List A debut on 17 February 2021, for Trinidad and Tobago, in the 2020–21 Super50 Cup.

In March 2021, Cricket West Indies (CWI) named Seales as a developmental player for the first Test match against Sri Lanka. In June 2021, Seales was named in a 17-man provisional squad for the Test series against South Africa. Prior to his selection, Seales had only played in ten professional matches, including just one first-class fixture. On 8 June 2021, CWI named Seales in the squad for the first Test against South Africa. On being named in the squad, Seales said that it was a "a dream come true" and hoped that he would be selected for the match. Seales made his Test debut on 6 June 2021, for the West Indies against South Africa. Despite a heavy defeat for the West Indies in the match, Seales took three wickets, including a wicket in the first over he bowled.

In August 2021, in the first match against Pakistan, Seales took his first five-wicket haul in Test cricket, with 5/55 in the second innings. In doing so, he became the youngest cricketer from the West Indies to take a five-wicket haul in Tests, breaking Alf Valentine's record set in 1950.

In November 2021, he was selected to play for the Jaffna Kings following the players' draft for the 2021 Lanka Premier League.

In December 2021, he was named in the West Indies' One Day International (ODI) squad for their series against Ireland. In May 2022, he was named in the West Indies ODI squads for their series against the Netherlands and Pakistan. He made his ODI debut on 4 June 2022, for the West Indies against the Netherlands.

References

External links
 

2001 births
Living people
West Indies Test cricketers
West Indies One Day International cricketers
Trinidad and Tobago cricketers
Trinbago Knight Riders cricketers
Place of birth missing (living people)
Jaffna Kings cricketers